Johannes Alvarez Manusama (17 August 1910 – 29 December 1995) was a former schoolteacher and freemason, RMS Minister of Education and Minister of Defence (1950), was the third president of the Republic of South Moluccas (1966–1993).

His father was South Moluccan, while his mother was Indo. After briefly administering the aspirant state in the territory of the Moluccas, Manusama lived the rest of his life advocating independence and heading a government in exile in the Netherlands. During his time, he hosted a regular radio show, "Voice of the Moluccas" and entered the Republic of South Maluku into the Unrepresented Nations and Peoples Organisation.

References

External links 
 

20th-century Dutch engineers
1910 births
1995 deaths
Dutch people of Indonesian descent
Dutch people of Moluccan descent
Indo people
Moluccan independence activists
Moluccan people
People from South Kalimantan
Presidents of the Republic of South Maluku